Abderaouf Natèche (born 16 October 1982) is an Algerian professional footballer who plays as a goalkeeper for Olympique de Médéa.

Club career
On June 11, 2014, Natèche signed a contract with MC Oran, joining them on a transfer from CS Constantine.

References

External links
 

1982 births
Living people
Algerian footballers
Algerian expatriate footballers
Algerian Ligue Professionnelle 1 players
Saudi First Division League players
USM El Harrach players
USM Sétif players
ES Sétif players
NA Hussein Dey players
CS Constantine players
MC Oran players
JS Saoura players
Ohod Club players
Al-Bukayriyah FC players
Association football goalkeepers
Expatriate footballers in Saudi Arabia
Algerian expatriate sportspeople in Saudi Arabia
21st-century Algerian people